L'Isle-en-Dodon is a commune in the Haute-Garonne department in southwestern France. The commune has the short border with the neighbouring department, Gers.

Geography
L'Isle-en-Dodon is located on the Save river, at the northern end of the plate of Lannemezan. The slopes which surround the city point out the nearby gersois country.

Population

The inhabitants of the commune are called lislois

Transportation
L'Isle-en-Dodon is 60 kilometres from Toulouse by road, a journey which takes approximately an hour. A regular bus service runs three times a day to Toulouse. At Saint-Gaudens,  to the south in the valley of the Garonne, the A64 autoroute and the SNCF train line pass.

See also
Communes of the Haute-Garonne department

References

Communes of Haute-Garonne
Comminges